Phelps County is a county in the U.S. state of Nebraska. As of the 2010 United States Census, the population was 9,188. Its county seat is Holdrege. The county was formed in 1873, and was named for William Phelps (1808–1889), a steamboat captain and early settler.

In the Nebraska license plate system, Phelps County is represented by the prefix 37 (it had the 37th-largest number of vehicles registered in the county when the license plate system was established in 1922).

It is considered part of the Kearney μSA's development and expansion plans.

Geography
Phelps County terrain consists of low rolling hills, mostly devoted to agriculture, sloping to the east, and dropping off toward the river basin along its northern boundary line. The Platte River flows eastward along the north line.

Major highways

  U.S. Highway 6
  U.S. Highway 34
  U.S. Highway 183
  Nebraska Highway 23

Adjacent counties

 Kearney County – east
 Franklin County – southeast
 Harlan County – south
 Furnas County – southwest
 Gosper County – west
 Dawson County – northwest
 Buffalo County – northeast

Protected areas

 Atlanta Marsh National Wildlife Management Area
 Cottonwood Federal Waterfowl Production Area
 Johnson Federal Waterfowl Production Area
 Jones Federal Waterfowl Production Area
 Lake Seldom Wildlife Refuge
 Lynder Federal Waterfowl Production Area
 Richardson Lagoon State Wildlife Management Area
 Sacramento-Wilcox State Wildlife Management Area

Demographics

As of the 2000 United States Census, there were 9,747 people, 3,844 households, and 2,683 families in the county. The population density was 18 people per square mile (7/km2). There were 4,191 housing units at an average density of 8 per square mile (3/km2). The racial makeup of the county was 97.79% White, 0.11% Black or African American, 0.28% Native American, 0.28% Asian, 0.79% from other races, and 0.75% from two or more races. 2.26% of the population were Hispanic or Latino of any race.

There were 3,844 households, out of which 33.10% had children under the age of 18 living with them, 61.60% were married couples living together, 5.80% had a female householder with no husband present, and 30.20% were non-families. 26.70% of all households were made up of individuals, and 13.00% had someone living alone who was 65 years of age or older. The average household size was 2.47 and the average family size was 3.00.

The county population contained 26.50% under the age of 18, 6.10% from 18 to 24, 25.80% from 25 to 44, 23.60% from 45 to 64, and 18.10% who were 65 years of age or older. The median age was 39 years. For every 100 females there were 96.10 males. For every 100 females age 18 and over, there were 92.90 males.

The median income for a household in the county was $37,319, and the median income for a family was $44,943. Males had a median income of $28,962 versus $21,741 for females. The per capita income for the county was $19,044. About 6.20% of families and 8.90% of the population were below the poverty line, including 12.10% of those under age 18 and 7.70% of those age 65 or over.

Communities

City
Holdrege (county seat)

Villages

 Atlanta
 Bertrand
 Funk
 Loomis

Unincorporated communities
 Clyde
 Sacramento
 Westmark

Townships

 Anderson
 Center
 Cottonwood
 Divide
 Garfield
 Industry-Rock Falls
 Laird
 Lake
 Prairie
 Sheridan
 Union
 Westmark
 Westside
 Williamsburg

Politics
Phelps County voters have been reliably Republican for decades. In no national election since 1936 has the county selected the Democratic Party candidate (as of 2020).

See also
 National Register of Historic Places listings in Phelps County, Nebraska

References

 
1873 establishments in Nebraska
Populated places established in 1873